Wendy Grace Lehnert is an American computer scientist specializing in natural language processing and known for her pioneering use of machine learning in natural language processing. She is a professor emerita at the University of Massachusetts Amherst.

Education and career
Lehnert earned a bachelor's degree in mathematics from Portland State University in 1972, and a master's degree from Yeshiva University in 1974. She became a student of Roger Schank at Yale University, completing her Ph.D. there in 1977 with a dissertation on The Process of Question Answering, and was hired by Yale as an assistant professor. She moved to the University of Massachusetts Amherst in 1982. At Amherst, her doctoral students have included Claire Cardie and Ellen Riloff. She retired in 2011.

Books
Lehnert has written both scholarly and popular books on computing, including:
The Process of Question Answering: A Computer Simulation of Cognition (L. Erlbaum Associates, 1978)
Light on the Web: Essentials to Make the 'Net Work for You (Addison-Wesley, 1981)
Strategies for Natural Language Processing (with Martin Ringle, L. Erlbaum Associates, 1982)
The Web Wizard's Guide to Freeware and Shareware (Addison-Wesley, 1982)
Internet 101: A Beginner's Guide to the Internet and the World Wide Web (Addison-Wesley, 1998)
The Web Wizard's Guide to HTML (Addison-Wesley, 2001)
Web 101: Making the Net Work for You (with Richard Kopec, Addison-Wesley; 3rd ed., 2007)

Recognition
In 1991, Lehnert was elected as an AAAI Fellow.

References

External links
Home page

Year of birth missing (living people)
Living people
American women computer scientists
American computer scientists
Computational linguistics researchers
Portland State University alumni
Yeshiva University alumni
Yale University alumni
Yale University faculty
University of Massachusetts Amherst faculty
Fellows of the Association for the Advancement of Artificial Intelligence
Natural language processing researchers
Machine learning researchers
American women academics
21st-century American women